Jai Jwala is a 1972 Hindi drama film directed by Manohar Deepak. The film stars Sunil Dutt and Madhumati M. Deepak.

Soundtrack

External links
 

1972 films
1970s Hindi-language films
1972 drama films